The Arts Tonight was a Canadian radio programme that aired weeknights from 10:00 to 10:40 p.m. on CBC Radio 2.

It debuted in 1988 with host Shelagh Rogers and covered theatre, dance, books, music and visual arts in Canada in a magazine and interview format. It was followed at 10:40 p.m. by Between the Covers. In 1993, it expanded for a time into a one-hour magazine show on Radio 2 followed by three hours of recorded concert performances of classical music; the concert portion was initially hosted by Paul Kennedy, and later by Peter Tiefenbach. This format lasted until 1996, when Tiefenbach moved to host a new daytime classical music show, Radio Concert Hall, while The Arts Tonight narrowed back down to a half-hour magazine format hosted on a rotating basis by Eleanor Wachtel, Erika Ritter and Carol Off.

In later years, the show was hosted solely by Wachtel.

The last episode aired on February 16, 2007.

References

External links
 The Arts Tonight - Canadian Communication Foundation

CBC Music programs
1988 radio programme debuts
2007 radio programme endings